Jarvis House may refer to:

in the United States
(by state, then city/town)
Laws-Jarvis House, Beebe, Arkansas, listed on the National Register of Historic Places (NRHP) in White County, Arkansas
Benjamin Jarvis House, Pasadena, California, listed on the NRHP in Los Angeles County, California
William W. Jarvis House, Troy, Illinois, listed on the NRHP in Madison County, Illinois
Col. Charles and Mary Ann Jarvis Homestead, Ellsworth, Maine, listed on the NRHP in Hancock County, Maine
The Jarvis, Cambridge, Massachusetts, listed on the NRHP in Middlesex County, Massachusetts
Jarvis-Fleet House, Huntington, New York, listed on the NRHP in Suffolk County, New York
Jones-Jarvis House, New Bern, North Carolina, listed on the NRHP in Craven County, North Carolina
Jarvis House (Sparta, North Carolina), listed on the NRHP in Alleghany County, North Carolina
Jarvis House (Chesterville, Ohio), listed on the NRHP in Morrow County, Ohio
Anna Jarvis House, Webster, West Virginia, listed on the NRHP in Taylor County, West Virginia